Bazancourt is a commune in the Marne department in northeastern France.

Geography
The Suippe flows northwest through the middle of the commune and crosses the village.

Population

See also
Communes of the Marne department

References

Communes of Marne (department)